PTC Inc. (formerly Parametric Technology Corporation) is an American computer software and services company founded in 1985 and headquartered in Boston, Massachusetts. The global technology company has over 6,000 employees across 80 offices in 30 countries, 1,150 technology partners and over $1bn in revenue. The company began developing parametric, associative feature-based, solid computer-aided design (CAD) modeling software in 1988, including an Internet-based product for product lifecycle management (PLM) in 1998. 

PTC products and services include Internet of things (IoT), augmented reality (AR), and collaboration software. They also do consulting, implementation and training business.

History

1985-1999
Russian immigrant and mathematician Samuel P. Geisberg worked at software-design providers Applicon and Computervision prior to forming Parametric Technology Corporation in May 1985. In 1988, the company unveiled its first Unix-based commercial product called Pro/ENGINEER and soon-after landed John Deere as its first customer. Pro/ENGINEER was the first parametric, feature-based solids modeling CAD software. Pro/ENGINEER could recognize a change in a single variable of a design and adjust the rest of the model accordingly.

Parametric's revenue grew quickly from $3 million in 1988 to $45 million in 1991. The company went public in 1989 with symbol PMTC. In 1992 IndustryWeek named Pro/ENGINEER 'Technology of the Year'. It made the Fortune 500 in 1995 and exceeded $800 million in revenue in 1997. The company made a few acquisitions in the 1990s including CDRS and 3DPaint products from Evans & Sutherland, Rasna Corp., Reflex and DivisionGroup.

In 1998, Parametric acquired the company (Computervision) its founder Geisberg had previously worked for. The company consequently acquired Computervision subsidiaries including Windchill Technology, a Minnesota-based startup co-founded by PTC CEO, James Heppelmann. Later that year, Parametric released its internet-based Windchill Product Lifecycle Management (PLM).

2000-2009
In the 2000s, Parametric developed lifecycle management software for products, assets, applications, processes and services through acquiring several companies including Polyplan Technologies, Arbortext, Aptavis Technologies Corp. (Retail PLM), NetRegulus, Synapsis Technology, Relex Software and Planet Metrics. It also made a few CAD-related acquisitions including Cadtrain, NC Graphics, Mathsoft (developers of Mathcad), ITEDO Software GmbH and CoCreate.

A Y2K-like bug in 2003 was described by The New York Times 20 days before it would have caused a problem.

In 2004 the company announced plans "to simplify its product management applications."

2010-2019
On October 1, 2010, James Heppelmann assumed the role of president and chief executive officer of Parametric. The company renamed its initial CAD product Pro/ENGINEER to PTC Creo. The company officially changed its legal name ‘Parametric Technology Corporation’ to PTC Inc and its NASDAQ ticker to PTC from PMTC in 2013. PTC continued to acquire CAD and PLM-related companies including MKS Software, 4CS Software Solutions, Servigistics, Enigma, NetIDEAS, Atego and Plugin76.
In December 2013, the company made its preliminary Internet of Things acquisition with the $112m takeover ThingWorx. PTC continued to acquire IoT companies with the acquisition of IoT connectivity management provider Axeda Corporation for $170m in August 2014, IoT predictive analytics company Coldlight for $105m in May 2015 and industrial connectivity provider Kepware for $100m in January 2016. The company made its initial outside investment into the Augmented Reality space with the acquisition of Vuforia from Qualcomm in November 2015 and then acquired Waypoint Labs in April 2018.

Rockwell Automation made a $1bn equity investment in PTC acquiring 8.4% ownership stake in PTC on June 11, 2018. PTC also announced major strategic partnerships with ANSYS and Microsoft in 2018.

Key dates
 1985 - Company founded by Samuel Geisberg, formerly from Prime Computer, Computervision, and Applicon.
 1988 - Steve Walske named CEO. Company shipped Pro/ENGINEER and was considered first to market with parametric modeling design software. This positions PTC as a leader in the CAD industry until the mid-1990s when a new generation of low-cost competitors arrive in the market.

 1989 - Initial public offering. 
 1992 - Caterpillar Inc. becomes PTC's largest customer. 
 1995 - Rasna, which "develops, markets and supports the Mechanica family of integrated software products for mechanical design."
 1996 - PTC acquires Reflex project modeling and management software technology sold the following year to the Beck Group.
 1998 -  Windchill released for product lifecycle management (PLM). PTC acquired Computervision Corp.
 1999 - Industries include aerospace, retail/footwear/apparel, automotive, industrial equipment, consumer products, electronics, and high tech.
 1999 - Acquired Division Group (Division Ltd, Bristol Uk, Division Inc) virtual reality head mounted display and software
 2002 - The company released Pro/ENGINEER Wildfire. This is the first CAD system to support web-based services.
 2004 - Acquired OHIO Design Automation. ECAD domain knowledge purchase resulting in what is currently Creo View ECAD.
 2005 - Acquired Arbortext for technical publishing technology. Acquired Aptavis for retail, footwear and apparel technology.
 2006 - Acquired Mathsoft for its engineering calculation software. Acquired ITEDO for its 3D technical illustration software.
 2007 - Acquired CoCreate for its direct modeling technology. 
 2008 - Acquired Synapsis for its performance analytics technology to improve environmental performance of products.
 2009 - Acquired Relex Software for its reliability engineering software. 
 2010 - James E. Heppelmann announced as CEO effective October 1, 2010. Company renames Pro/ENGINEER to PTC Creo.
 2011 - Acquired 4CS for its warranty, service, support and service parts technology. Acquired MKS for its application lifecycle management technology for all software development processes.
 2012 - Acquired Servigistics for its suite of service lifecycle management software. 
 2013 - Acquired NetIDEAS hosting vendor for more technology deployment options. Acquired Enigma for its ability to deliver technical content to aftermarket service environments.
 2013 - Acquired Internet of Things platform developer ThingWorx for their software applications that connect and track network-enabled products.
 2013 - Acquired ThingWorx, the Exton, Pennsylvania-based creators of an award-winning platform for building and running applications for the Internet of Things (IoT).
 2013 - The company changed its legal name from Parametric Technology Corporation to PTC Inc.
 2013 - The company changed its NASDAQ ticker symbol to "PTC" from "PMTC".
 2014 - Acquired Axeda Corporation.
 2014 - Acquired ATEGO Software, a MBSE (model-based systems engineering) tool used in aerospace, transportation, and automotive industries (such as Alstom Transport and Rolls-Royce Defence).
 2015 - Acquired the Vuforia business from Qualcomm Connected Experiences, Inc., a subsidiary of Qualcomm Incorporated. The Vuforia platform is an augmented reality (AR) technology platform.
 2015 - Acquired Kepware Technologies, a software development company that provides communications connectivity to industrial automation environments.
2018 - Acquired Waypoint Labs, a startup out of MIT / Harvard that allows frontline experts to capture and transfer knowledge using augmented reality
 2018 - Acquired Frustum, a generative design software company which takes advantage of artificial intelligence.
 2019 - Acquired Twnkls, a Netherlands-based augmented reality services company. 
 2019 - Signed Agreement to Acquire Onshape.
2020 - Signed Agreement to Acquire Arena Software.
2022 - Acquired Intland Software for $280 million
2022 - Announced intention to acquire ServiceMax from majority-owner Silver Lake.

Organization
PTC has divisions for different product segments.

Internet of Things

PTC offers ThingWorx for the Internet of things.

Augmented Reality
PTC's augmented reality offerings use the Vuforia brand.

Creo

The PTC Creo suite includes product design and engineering software. Creo runs on Microsoft Windows and provides apps for 3D CAD parametric feature solid modeling, 3D direct modeling, 2D orthographic views, Finite Element Analysis and simulation, schematic design, technical illustrations, and viewing and visualization. Creo integrates with PTC's other product development offerings, including Windchill, Mathcad, and Arbortext. Mathcad is used to solve, analyze, and share engineering calculations.

CAD
The PTC CAD product provides computer aided design capabilities. PTC CAD is a suite of 2D and 3D product design software used to create, analyze and view product designs. PTC Creo software was released in June 2011 to replace and supersede PTC's products formerly known as Pro/ENGINEER, CoCreate, and ProductView. O

PLM
Windchill is the brand for product lifecycle management information such as CAD models, documents, technical illustrations, embedded software and calculations.

Mathcad

Engineering calculation software that is used by engineers to solve, document and share the calculations used for product design.

SLM
Service lifecycle management (SLM) software is used by manufacturers to understand how service planning, customer service, and analysis of returned product data can improve service value over a product's life. 
The Servigistics product integrates service planning, delivery and analysis to optimize service outcomes by providing a single view of service. 

PTC SLM products include what was formerly Arbortext. Servigistics Arbortext enables manufacturers to create, illustrate, manage and publish technical and service parts information.

Kepware 
Kepware software, primarily KEPServerEX, is a connectivity platform industrial automation endpoints. The software enables users to connect, manage, monitor, and control heterogeneous devices.

Other
PTC president and CEO James (Jim) Hepplemann contributed to Harvard Business Review reports in 2014, 2015, and 2017. 
In September 2017, PTC announced plans to move headquarters from Needham, Massachusetts to Boston's Seaport District in January 2019.

References

External links

Companies listed on the Nasdaq
Companies based in Boston
Software companies established in 1985
Software companies based in Massachusetts
Software companies of the United States
1980s initial public offerings
1985 establishments in Massachusetts
Computer-aided design software
Computer-aided manufacturing software
Computer-aided engineering software